The Gamow factor, Sommerfeld factor or Gamow–Sommerfeld factor, named after its discoverer George Gamow or after Arnold Sommerfeld, is a probability factor for two nuclear particles' chance of overcoming the Coulomb barrier in order to undergo nuclear reactions, for example in nuclear fusion. By classical physics, there is almost no possibility for protons to fuse by crossing each other's Coulomb barrier at temperatures commonly observed to cause fusion, such as those found in the sun. When George Gamow instead applied quantum mechanics to the problem, he found that there was a significant chance for the fusion due to tunneling.

The probability of two nuclear particles overcoming their electrostatic barriers is given by the following equation:
 

where  is the Gamow energy,

 

Here,  is the reduced mass of the two particles.

While the probability of overcoming the Coulomb barrier increases rapidly with increasing particle energy, for a given temperature, the probability of a particle having such an energy falls off very fast, as described by the Maxwell–Boltzmann distribution.  Gamow found that, taken together, these effects mean that for any given temperature, the particles that fuse are mostly in a temperature-dependent narrow range of energies known as the Gamow window.

Derivation
Gamow first solved the one-dimensional case of quantum tunneling using the WKB approximation. Considering a wave function of a particle of mass m, we take area 1 to be where a wave is emitted, area 2 the potential barrier which has height V and width l (at ), and area 3 its other side, where the wave is arriving, partly transmitted and partly reflected. For a wave number k and energy E we get:

For , this is easily solved by ignoring the time exponential and considering the real part alone (the imaginary part has the same behavior).

Due to the symmetry of the problem, the emitting waves on both sides must have equal amplitudes (A), but their phases (α) may be different. This gives a single extra parameter; however, gluing the two solutions at  requires two boundary conditions (for both the wave function and its derivative), so in general there is no solution. Since the factor is in general complex (hence its vanishing imposes two constraints, representing the two boundary conditions), this can in general be solved by adding an imaginary part of k, which gives the extra parameter needed. Thus E will have an imaginary part as well.

The physical meaning of this is that the standing wave in the middle decays; the emitted waves newly emitted have therefore smaller amplitudes, so that their amplitude decays in time but grows with distance.

λ can be estimated without solving explicitly, by noting its effect on the probability current conservation law. Since the probability flows from the middle to the sides, we have:

Note the factor of 2 is due to having two emitted waves.

Taking , this gives:

Remembering the imaginary part added to k is much smaller than the real part, we may now neglect it and get:

Note that  is the particle velocity, so the first factor is the classical rate by which the particle trapped between the barriers hits them.

Finally, moving to the three-dimensional problem, the spherically symmetric Schrödinger equation reads (expanding the wave function  in spherical harmonics and looking at the n-th term):

We take the Coulomb potential:

where  is the Coulomb constant, e the electron charge, z = 2 is the charge number of the alpha particle and Z the charge number of the nucleus (Z-z after emitting the particle).

This can be solved by substituting  and then  and solving for θ, giving:

where .
Since x is small, the x-dependent factor is of order 1.

with:

and the fine structure constant .

For a radium alpha decay, Z = 88, z = 2 and m = 4mp, EG is approximately 50 GeV.

References

External links
 Modeling Alpha Half-life (Georgia State University)

Nuclear physics